There are several surface-to-air missile design bureaus in Russia, including MKB Fakel, NPO Novator, and DNPP.

MKB Fakel

The MKB Fakel design bureau is located in Khimki Moscow Oblast, and was founded in 1953 under the designation OKB-2. The bureau has designed the following tactical and strategic surface-to-air missiles, as well as exoatmospheric anti-ballistic missile interceptors:

V-750 series missiles (for SA-2 / S-75) systems), 
5V24 (V-600), 5V27 (V-601) missiles (for SA-3 / S-125 systems),
5V21, 5V28, 5V28V missiles (for SA-5 / S-200 systems), 
5V55K, 5V55R, 5V55R / 5V55KD, 5V55U, 48N6, 48N6E2 missiles (for SA-10 and SA-20 / S-300P-series systems), 
40N6 (for the SA-21 / S-400 system), 
9M96 series (for the SA-21 / S-400 and the S-350 systems),
9M33, 9M33M1, 9M33M2, 9M33M3, 9A33BM3 missiles (for SA-8 / 9K33 Osa system),
9M330, 9M331, 9M332, 9M338 missiles (for the SA-15 / 9K330 Tor-series systems), 
51T6 (SH-11) Gorgon missile (for the A-135 ABM-system).

NPO Novator 

The NPO Novator design bureau is located in Yekaterinburg Sverdlovsk Oblast, and was founded in 1947 under the designation OKB-8. The bureau has designed the following tactical and strategic surface-to-air missiles for Air Defence Troops of Ground Forces, as well as endoatmospheric anti-ballistic missile interceptors:
9M8 missiles (for SA-4 / 2K11 Krug systems),
9M38 missiles (for SA-11 / Buk systems),
9M82, 9M83 missiles (for SA-12 / S-300V systems),
53T6 (SH-08) Gazelle missile (for the A-135 ABM-system).

DNPP 

Dolgoprudnenskoe Scientific Production Plant is located in Dolgoprudny Moscow Oblast and was founded in 1931. 

9M38M1 missiles (for SA-11 / Buk-M1/M1-2 systems)
9M317 missile for SA-17 / Buk-M2 system and for the naval version Shtil-1

NIIP Tikhomirov

The Tikhomirov Scientific Research Institute of Instrument Design is located in Zhukovsky Moscow Oblast and was founded in 1955 under the designation OKB-11 GKAT. The institute has designed the following tactical surface-to-air missile systems: 
SA-6 / 2K12 Kub,
SA-11a / 9K37M1 Buk-M1, 9K37M1-2 SA-11b Buk-M1-2,
SA-17 / 9K317 Buk-M2
9K317M Buk-M3

KB Tochmash

The Nudelman Precision Engineering Design Bureau (KB Tochmash) is located in Moscow and was founded in 1934 under the designation OKB-16. The bureau has designed the following tactical surface-to-air missile systems:
SA-9 / 9K31 Strela-1 Self Propelled Air Defense Missile System,
SA-13 / 9K35 Strela-10 Tracked Air Defense Missile System,
9K35 Strela-10 in modified versions (M/M1/M2/M3 and M4),
Sosna Tracked Air Defense Missile System (current export version of the legacy Strela-10),
Palma Naval Air Defense Gun and Missile Close-in weapon System.

KBP
The Joint Stock Company KBP Instrument Design Bureau is located in the city of Tula, Tula Oblast and was founded in 1927. The company offers the following combined gun and missile air defense systems:
SA-22 / Pantsir-S1 Self Propelled Missile and Gun System with 57E6 missiles,
CADS-N-1 / Kashtan-M Naval Air Defense Gun and Missile Close-in weapon System with 9M311K and 9M311E missiles,
SA-19 / 2K22 Tunguska-M1 Tracked Missile and Gun System with 9M311, 9M311K, 9M311-1, 9M311M and 9M311-M1 missiles.

KBM
 
The Joint Stock Company KB Mashynostroyeniya (KBM) which is located in Kolomna was founded in 1942. KBM offers the following MANPADS.
SA-7a / 9K32 Strela-2, SA-7b / 9K32M Strela-2M 
SA-14 / 9K34 Strela-3
SA-16 / 9K310 Igla-1
SA-18 / 9K38 Igla
SA-24 / 9K338 Igla-S
9K333 Verba

Summary

References

External links
MKB Fakel 
NPO Novator  
NIIP 
KB Tochmash 
KBM 
KPB  

Surface-to-air missiles of Russia
Science and technology in Russia
Science and technology in the Soviet Union